Transmembrane protein 59 is a protein that in humans is encoded by the TMEM59 gene.

TMEM59 is a membrane bound protein that is localized to the Golgi apparatus. The precise function of TMEM59 is not known, however it has been demonstrated that expression of TMEM59 protein inhibits Golgi glycosylation of  amyloid precursor protein (APP) and blocks APP cleavage by the α- and β-amyloid precursor protein secretases and therefore inhibits formation of the beta amyloid peptide that forms  amyloid plaques in Alzheimer's disease. Moreover, TMEM59 has been shown to potentiate wnt signaling by promoting formation of the wnt receptor signalosomes. Transmembrane interactions between TMEM59 and the wnt receptor Frizzled were found to drive receptor multimerization that leads to improved potency and efficacy of wnt signaling.

References

Further reading